Sheerness Generating Station is a natural gas-fired power station owned by Heartland Generation (50%) and TransAlta (50%), located southeast of Hanna, Alberta.

Description 

Two Hitachi turbines with Alstom boilers.

References

Coal-fired power stations in Alberta
ATCO
Special Area No. 2